Frank Cousins may refer to:

 Frank Cousins (British politician) (1904–1986), British trade union leader and Labour politician
 Frank Cousins (American politician) (born 1958), American politician who served as the Essex County, Massachusetts Sheriff
 Frank Cousins (photographer) (1851–1925), American writer and photographer of Federal style architecture in New England

See also
Frank Couzens (1902–1950), mayor of Detroit, Michigan